Magomed-Rasul Ramazanovich Akhmedov (born 20 September 1966) is a Russian professional football coach and a former player.

Playing career
As a player, he made his debut in the Soviet Second League in 1982 for FC Dynamo Makhachkala.

He made his Russian Football National League debut for FC Spartak Anapa on 27 June 1992 in a game against FC Tekstilshchik Ivanovo. That was his only season in the FNL.

References

1966 births
People from Laksky District
Living people
Soviet footballers
Russian footballers
Association football midfielders
FC Dynamo Moscow reserves players
FC Spartak-UGP Anapa players
FC Anzhi Makhachkala players
Russian football managers
FC Dynamo Makhachkala players
Sportspeople from Dagestan